Chalmazel is a former commune in the Loire department in central France. On 1 January 2016, it was merged into the new commune Chalmazel-Jeansagnière.

Ski area

Chalmazel is a small ski resort situated above the village of Chalmazel in central France.  The main activities offered at the resort are alpine skiing, nordic skiing, snowshoeing, ski touring, dog sledding and hiking. It is a calm resort popular with families and locals, as it boasts gentle runs, panoramic views and short queues.

Geography
The river Lignon du Forez has its source in the commune.

See also
Communes of the Loire department

References

Former communes of Loire (department)
Ski resorts in France